The 1983–84 NBA season was the Detroit Pistons' 36th season in the NBA and 27th season in the city of Detroit.  The team played at the Pontiac Silverdome in surburban Pontiac, Michigan.

During the 1984 playoffs against the New York Knicks, the Silverdome had a venue conflict that forced the team to play their last playoff game in Detroit proper at the Detroit Red Wings' home, Joe Louis Arena, in the fifth and deciding game of the round. The team would play a number of home games, both regular season and post-season, at the venue over the next few seasons (due to the roof collapsing) before eventually getting an arena of their own four years later.

New coach Chuck Daly made an immediate impact on the team, leading the Pistons to their first winning season and post-season berth since the 1976-77 season.  Detroit finished with a 49-33 (.598) record, 2nd in the Central Division.  In the first round series, the Pistons faced off with the New York Knicks and star Bernard King.  The tightly contested series went to a 5th game at a sold-out Joe Louis Arena in downtown Detroit.  The Pistons trailed by eight points with 1:34 remaining in the fourth quarter, when Thomas caught fire, scoring 16 points in the remaining 94 seconds to force overtime, but it wasn't enough to overcome King's 44 points as the Pistons fell 127-123 in a playoff classic. 

Part of the 5th game in the series was the atmosphere as the Pistons returned to the city proper after moving to the Silverdome in 1978.  Thomas said, "I must say that it was a wild scene. Coleman Young called me up and said, ‘Welcome to the city.’ Everybody in the hood was like, ‘Zeke, you’re coming to put on a show tonight.’ And being a city guy, it was almost like you were going home.  When I got into Joe Louis, the atmosphere was so electric, it was awesome. You can’t describe it—it made you want to get off. I just felt like I could do anything. The fans were screaming and every move you made, people were oohing and aahing—it was sweet. I’m not a Baptist; I was raised Catholic. But sometimes I’d go to a Baptist church and you’ll see what they call the Holy Ghost, where the spirit will take over their body and it moves them.  During that game I got the Holy Ghost — I just got the spirit into my body and I was doing stuff and making moves — I felt I was above the court looking at everybody and I could just do anything. It was great!"  

Detroit was led on the season by guard Thomas (21.3 ppg, 11.1 apg, NBA All-Star), center Bill Laimbeer (17.3 ppg, 12.2 rpg, NBA All-Star) and forward Kelly Tripucka (21.3 ppg, NBA All-Star).

On Dec 13, 1983, the Pistons finished 3OT with the Nuggets. The pistons beat Nuggets 186-184. This is the most scoring game in NBA. Thomas scored 47. Kiki Vandeweghe scored 51 and Alex English also scored 47 points.

Draft picks

Roster

Regular season

Season standings

z - clinched division title
y - clinched division title
x - clinched playoff spot

Record vs. opponents

Game log

Regular season

|- align="center" bgcolor="#ccffcc"
| 1
| October 28, 1983
| Boston
| W 127–121
|
|
|
| Pontiac Silverdome
| 1–0

|- align="center" bgcolor="#ccffcc"
| 3
| November 1, 1983
| Milwaukee
| W 106–93
|
|
|
| Pontiac Silverdome
| 2–1
|- align="center" bgcolor="#ffcccc"
| 7
| November 11, 1983
| @ Boston
| L 118–126
|
|
|
| Boston Garden
| 3–4
|- align="center" bgcolor="#ffcccc"
| 16
| November 27, 1983
| @ Boston
| L 99–114
|
|
|
| Boston Garden
| 7–9

|- align="center" bgcolor="#ffcccc"
| 24
| December 17, 1983
| Boston
| L 115–129
|
|
|
| Pontiac Silverdome
| 11–13

|- align="center" bgcolor="#ccffcc"
| 32
| January 4, 1984
| Phoenix
| W 128–114
|
|
|
| Pontiac Silverdome
| 17–15
|- align="center" bgcolor="#ccffcc"
| 34
| January 8, 1984
| @ Milwaukee
| W 111–100
|
|
|
| MECCA Arena
| 19–15

|- align="center" bgcolor="#ffcccc"
| 46
| February 5, 1984
| @ Boston
| L 134–137 (OT)
|
|
|
| Boston Garden
| 25–21

|- align="center" bgcolor="#ffcccc"
| 60
| March 4, 1984
| Los Angeles
| L 114–118
|
|
|
| Pontiac Silverdome
| 34–26
|- align="center" bgcolor="#ffcccc"
| 65
| March 13, 1984
| @ Milwaukee
| L 95–116
|
|
|
| MECCA Arena
| 38–27
|- align="center" bgcolor="#ccffcc"
| 70
| March 23, 1984
| @ Los Angeles
| W 121–118
|
|
|
| The Forum
| 40–30
|- align="center" bgcolor="#ccffcc"
| 71
| March 24, 1984
| @ Phoenix
| W 120–109
|
|
|
| Arizona Veterans Memorial Coliseum
| 41–30
|- align="center" bgcolor="#ccffcc"
| 75
| March 31, 1984
| Milwaukee
| W 107–105
|
|
|
| Pontiac Silverdome
| 44–31

|- align="center" bgcolor="#ffcccc"
| 78
| April 7, 1984
| @ Milwaukee
| L 92–110
|
|
|
| MECCA Arena
| 46–32
|- align="center" bgcolor="#ccffcc"
| 81
| April 13, 1984
| Boston
| W 128–120 (OT)
|
|
|
| Pontiac Silverdome
| 49–32

Playoffs

|- align="center" bgcolor="#ffcccc"
| 1
| April 17
| New York
| L 93–94
| Kelly Tripucka (26)
| Kent Benson (14)
| Isiah Thomas (9)
| Pontiac Silverdome14,127
| 0–1
|- align="center" bgcolor="#ccffcc"
| 2
| April 19
| New York
| W 113–105
| Bill Laimbeer (31)
| Bill Laimbeer (15)
| Isiah Thomas (13)
| Pontiac Silverdome14,275
| 1–1
|- align="center" bgcolor="#ffcccc"
| 3
| April 22
| @ New York
| L 113–120
| Kelly Tripucka (40)
| Bill Laimbeer (10)
| Isiah Thomas (5)
| Madison Square Garden16,354
| 1–2
|- align="center" bgcolor="#ccffcc"
| 4
| April 25
| @ New York
| W 119–112
| Isiah Thomas (22)
| Bill Laimbeer (10)
| Isiah Thomas (16)
| Madison Square Garden18,205
| 2–2
|- align="center" bgcolor="#ffcccc"
| 5
| April 27
| New York
| L 123–127 (OT)
| Isiah Thomas (35)
| Bill Laimbeer (17)
| Isiah Thomas (12)
| Joe Louis Arena21,208
| 2–3
|-

Awards and records
Isiah Thomas, All-NBA First Team

References

See also
1983-84 NBA season

Detroit Pistons seasons
Det
Detroit Pistons
Detroit Pistons